Wilfred Brownlee (18 April 1890 – 12 October 1914) was an English cricketer. He played for Gloucestershire between 1909 and 1914. While serving as a second lieutenant in the Dorsetshire Regiment, Brownlee died of meningitis before he could serve in the First World War.

References

1890 births
1914 deaths
British Army personnel of World War I
British military personnel killed in World War I
English cricketers
Gloucestershire cricketers
Cricketers from Bristol
Dorset Regiment officers
Infectious disease deaths in England
Neurological disease deaths in England
Deaths from meningitis
Gentlemen of the South cricketers